Iago Falque Silva (born 4 January 1990) is a Spanish professional footballer who plays as a forward for America de Cali.

Club career

Early career
Born in Vigo, Galicia, Falque began his career with Real Madrid before moving to Barcelona in 2001. After several years in the club's youth ranks, he was never aggregated either to the first team of Frank Rijkaard nor B side of Luis Enrique. On 30 August 2008, Falque signed a four-year contract with Juventus, and was officially presented on 2 September 2008. He transferred to the Serie A club on a free deal which included compensation to Barcelona up to €2.5 million if certain matches and goals were reached by the player in his stay with the club.

On 25 August 2009, Falque was transferred on loan to Bari, then newly promoted to Serie A.

On 29 July 2010, Falque joined Villarreal B on loan with the right of redemption.

Tottenham Hotspur
On 25 August 2011, Falque joined Premier League club Tottenham Hotspur on a season-long loan deal, with an option to make the move permanent. He was first named in a matchday squad on 10 September, remaining unused in a 2–0 win at Wolverhampton Wanderers, and made his debut five days later by starting in a goalless away draw against PAOK in the season's UEFA Europa League.

On 9 December 2012, he played his only Premier League match, appearing for five minutes at the end of a 1–2 loss at Everton as a substitute for striker Jermain Defoe.

Loans to Southampton and Almería
On 16 January 2012, Tottenham signed Falque permanently for €1 million (€250,000 went to Barcelona), loaning him to Championship leaders Southampton for the remainder of the season. He made his Southampton debut seven days later, starting in a 0–2 home loss against Leicester City. However, he failed to make any other appearance with Saints, subsequently returning to Tottenham in June, and on 18 July he scored in a pre-season 2–0 victory at Stevenage.

On 23 January 2013, Falque joined Almería on loan until the end of the season. He made his debut for the Andalusians on 4 February in a 1–2 away loss against Real Madrid Castilla, and scored his first goal on 24 February in a 4–1 home routing over Ponferradina.

Loan to Rayo Vallecano
On 22 August 2013, Falque joined La Liga side Rayo Vallecano in a season-long loan deal, with a buyout clause. He made his division debut eight days later in a 1–2 home loss against Levante. In February 2014, Falque scored his first goals for Rayo, in a 4–1 win over Málaga; for the first, he "rushed down the right wing, beating two defenders with a turn and a nutmeg before knocking the ball in off the near post", and in the second, "exhibiting the same quick feet and ability to float past defenders as he did in the first".

Genoa
On 1 August 2014, Genoa confirmed the signing of Falque. He scored his first Serie A goal on 2 November in a 4–2 win at Udinese. On 24 February 2015, Falque opened the scoring in the Derby della Lanterna against Sampdoria, an eventual 1–1 draw. He scored his 12th and 13th goals of the season on 17 May in a 4–1 win away to Atalanta.

Roma
On 1 July 2015, Falque's transfer to Roma was confirmed as a season-loan deal for €1 million, with a buyout clause activated as soon as he plays one official match for Roma with the additional sum of €7 million with €1 million performance-related bonus. The contract that Falque signed after the buyout clause will be until 30 June 2020.

Torino
On 19 July 2016, it was announced that Falque was loaned to Torino with a buying option for the 2016–17 season. He scored his first goal in Serie A for Torino on 11 September, from a free-kick, in a 2–1 defeat to Atalanta. On 25 September he scored a brace, in a 3–1 victory against parent club Roma. He finished his first season with Torino with 12 goals and 8 assists, his personal best since 2015 at Genoa.

On 4 January 2017, the day of his 27th birthday, it was announced that Torino exercised the right to purchase Falque outright. He started the 2017–18 season with Torino, playing two consecutive seasons for the same club for the first time in his career. He finished the season as top-scorer for Torino with 12 goals and eight assists (plus two goals in Coppa Italia), his personal best season.

Loan to Genoa
On 31 January 2020, Falque returned to Genoa on loan with an option to purchase.

Loan to Benevento
On 29 September 2020, Iago Falque joined Benevento on loan until 30 June 2021.

América de Cali
On 23 January 2022, Falque joined Colombian team América de Cali.

International career
In 2008, Falque played for the Galicia national football team in a friendly match against Iran.

Career statistics

Club

Honours

Club
Juventus F.C. Youth Sector
 Torneo di Viareggio: 2009, 2010

International
Spain U17 
FIFA U-17 World Cup runner-up: 2007

References

External links
 
 
 Futbolme profile 
 
 
 
 

1990 births
Living people
Footballers from Vigo
Spanish footballers
A.S. Roma players
Genoa C.F.C. players
Juventus F.C. players
La Liga players
Premier League players
Rayo Vallecano players
Segunda División players
Serie A players
Southampton F.C. players
Spain under-21 international footballers
Spain youth international footballers
Spanish expatriate footballers
Association football wingers
English Football League players
Expatriate footballers in England
Expatriate footballers in Italy
Spanish expatriate sportspeople in England
Spanish expatriate sportspeople in Italy
Tercera División players
Torino F.C. players
Tottenham Hotspur F.C. players
UD Almería players
Villarreal CF B players
Benevento Calcio players